Tauʻalupe Oko Liku ("Tau") is a Tongan former professional rugby league footballer who represented Tonga at the 1995 World Cup. 

Tau Liku came over to England in 1994 to play for Leigh Centurions (Heritage № 1073) and became one of three overseas players to make over 100 appearances for the Centurions. In 1995, Liku went on to represent Tonga in their very first Rugby League World Cup appearance and scored in that World Cup vs. Papua New Guinea. He enjoyed stints for Cumbrian sides Workington Town and Barrow Raiders before returning to play for Swinton Lions. In 2005, due to family reasons, Liku retired from rugby league. He resides still in Leigh with his wife and two children.

References

1971 births
Living people
Barrow Raiders players
Leigh Leopards players
Rugby league props
Rugby league second-rows
Swinton Lions players
Tonga national rugby league team players
Tongan rugby league players
Workington Town players